Copeville is a town and a locality in the Australian state of South Australia.

It was established as a town on the Waikerie railway line, but the line has closed and the town has declined. The bulk grain silos are still at the railway station, but do not operate every grain season. There was once a Methodist church in Copeville. It joined the Karoonda circuit in 1966.

The 2016 Australian census which was conducted in August 2016 reports that Copeville had a population of 34 people.

Copeville is located within the federal division of Barker, the state electoral district of Hammond and the local government area of the District Council of Karoonda East Murray.

See also
Bandon Conservation Park

References

Towns in South Australia
Murray Mallee